The Georgetown Center on Privacy and Technology is a think tank at Georgetown University in Washington, DC dedicated to the study of privacy and technology. Established in 2014, it is housed within the Georgetown University Law Center. The goal of the Center is to conduct research and empower legal and legislative advocacy around issues of privacy and surveillance, with a focus on how such issues affect groups of different social class and race. In May 2022, the Center's founding director Alvaro Bedoya was confirmed as a commissioner of the United States Federal Trade Commission.

Activities

Surveillance
From 2016 to 2019, the Center hosted an annual conference titled "The Color of Surveillance" which explored how government and technological surveillance affected different marginalized populations, including Black Americans, immigrants to the United States, religious minorities, and poor and working people.

Facial recognition
The Center has collaborated with many advocacy organizations, including the ACLU, the Algorithmic Justice League, and the Electronic Frontier Foundation, as part of campaigns raising awareness about the use of facial recognition by the government. 
In 2016, the Center published a report called The Perpetual Line-Up: Unregulated Police Face Recognition in America which documents the widespread unregulated use of facial recognition by law enforcement across the United States. In 2018, a Freedom of Information Act lawsuit brought by the Center against the New York Police Department revealed that facial recognition scans were being run on mugshots of every arrestee. A subsequent report in 2019, "Garbage In, Garbage Out: Face Recognition on Flawed Data" documented multiple cases of police departments attempting to identify suspects using hand-drawn sketches, highly edited photos, and photos of celebrity lookalikes.

Reference

External links
Official website
The Perpetual Line-Up

Georgetown University programs
Georgetown University Law Center
Educational institutions established in 2014
Think tanks established in 2014
Legal think tanks
Political and economic think tanks in the United States
Science and technology think tanks